Education and Literacy Department is a department of the Government of Sindh, Pakistan.
The primary objective of the department is to look after the educational affairs within the province and co-ordinate with Federal Government and donor agencies regarding promotion of education in the province. The department plays supervisory role of Primary education and manages Secondary education, Technical Education, incentive programs and development schemes. Government of Sindh has bifurcated Education and Literacy Department into two separate departments College Education Department and School Education Department on 6 October 2016 hence having two different Secretaries of the departments.

Facts
There are 327 public sector Colleges are functioning under the College Education Department of Sindh and 42,900 Primary Schools, 2,429 Elementary Schools and 2,065 High Schools under the department.

Autonomous Bodies

Reform Support Unit 
Reform Support Unit was established to build the institutional capability of the Department of Education.

Girls Stipend 
The Education & Literacy Department initiated distribution of stipends to female students in rural area to increase literacy rate, under the Sindh Structural Adjustment Credit a program of World Bank.

Sindh Textbook Board 
Production and publication of textbooks and supplementary reading material relating to textbooks.

Bureau of Curriculum 
Bureau of Curriculum & Extension Wing  is responsible for curriculum development.

Sindh Education Foundation 
The Sindh Education Foundation is an autonomous body to encourage and promote education in the private sector operating on non-profit basis.

Provincial institute of Teacher Education 
Provincial institute of Teacher Education was established in 1995 with help of Asian Development Bank, as a teacher education institute.

Sindh Teachers Education Development Authority 
Sindh Teachers Education Development Authority oversee and regulate the teacher training activities and to maintain the standards of the trainings and the training providers.

Sindh Basic Education Program 
SBEP is a program of the department and USAID under which 120 schools will be constructed by USAID in Sindh's under developed areas. The program is valued around $155 million.

See also 
 Education in Pakistan

References

External links
 Education and Literacy Department
 Bureau of Curriculum
 Sindh Education Foundation
 Reform Support Unit

Departments of Government of Sindh
Education in Pakistan
Sindh